Black Memory is a 1947 British crime film directed by Oswald Mitchell and starring Michael Atkinson, Myra O'Connell and Michael Medwin. It featured the first screen appearance of Sid James, known for the Carry On films. Also making her film acting debut in Black Memory was the Welsh-born actor, playwright, screenwriter and film director Jane Arden.

Premise
When his father is wrongly convicted and hanged for murder, son Danny poses as a juvenile delinquent, and ten years later manages to clear his father's name.

Cast
 Michael Atkinson as Danny Cruff 
 Myra O'Connell as Joan Davidson 
 Michael Medwin as Johnnie Fletcher 
 Sid James (credited as Sydney James) as Eddie Clinton 
 Frank Hawkins as Alf Davidson 
 Jane Arden as Sally Davidson
 Winifred Melville as Mrs. Davidson 
 Michael Conry as Carl Broach 
 Betty Miller as Mrs. Cruff 
 Arthur Brander as Rutford 
 Gerald Pring as Hawkins, the headmaster 
 Valerie Hulton as Miss Philpotts 
 Maurice Nicholas as Johnnie, as a boy 
 Malcolm Sommers as Danny, as a boy

Critical reception
TV Guide wrote: "Weak story, poor dialog; everyone's just kiddin' around"; while Mystery File wrote: "it’s only in bits and pieces and occasional places that the plot rises above the purely pedestrian. If I were Leonard Maltin, the best I could give this movie would be 1½ stars out of five and I still think I’d be just a little bit generous if I did. Nonetheless, its historical significance is high, so I was glad to have had the opportunity to have seen it, and you may too."

References

External links
 

1947 films
British crime films
British black-and-white films
1947 crime films
Films directed by Oswald Mitchell
1940s English-language films
1940s British films